Archilestes is a genus of damselflies in the family Lestidae. Like most members of Lestidae, Archliestes rest with their wings spread out. This genus has eight species, the great spreadwing and California spreadwing are the most common and widespread.

The genus contains the following species:

Notes

References

Lestidae
Zygoptera genera
Taxa named by Edmond de Sélys Longchamps